Fonoimoana is a surname. Notable people with the surname include:

 Eric Fonoimoana (born 1969), American beach volleyball player, Olympic gold medalist
 Falyn Fonoimoana (born 1996), American indoor and beach volleyball player
 Lelei Fonoimoana (born 1958), American swimmer, Olympic silver medalist

Surnames from given names